Mari Eide (born 18 November, 1989) is a retired cross-country skier from Norway. She has competed in the World Cup since the 2010 season. She was selected to participate in the 2018 Winter Olympics. She is the younger sister of former cross-country skier Ida Eide, who died of cardiac arrest during a foot race in Jessheim, 2 September, 2018.

She announced her retirement from cross-country skiing in February 2021.

Cross-country skiing results
All results are sourced from the International Ski Federation (FIS).

World Championships
1 medal – (1 bronze)

World Cup

Season standings

Team podiums
 1 victory – (1 ) 
 2 podiums – (2 )

References

External links

1989 births
Living people
Norwegian female cross-country skiers
FIS Nordic World Ski Championships medalists in cross-country skiing